Test Pilot may refer to:

Test pilot, pilots who work on developing, evaluating and proving experimental aircraft
Test Pilot (cocktail), a 1933 tiki drink by Donn Beach
Test Pilot (film) a 1938 film about test pilots with Clark Gable, Myrna Loy, Spencer Tracy and Lionel Barrymore